Edward Malcolm Bruce (May 10, 1861 – September 9, 1919) was an American archer. He competed in the men's double York round, men's double American round, and the men's team round at the 1904 Summer Olympics.

He died in Chicago on September 9, 1919.

References

External links

1861 births
1919 deaths
Olympic archers of the United States
American male archers
Archers at the 1904 Summer Olympics
Sportspeople from Aurora, Illinois